United Nations Security Council Resolution 1989, adopted unanimously on June 17, 2011, after recalling resolutions 1267 (1999), 1333 (2000), 1363 (2001), 1373 (2001), 1390 (2002), 1452 (2002), 1455 (2003), 1526 (2004), 1566 (2004), 1617 (2005), 1624 (2005), 1699 (2006), 1730 (2006), 1735 (2006), 1822 (2008), 1904 (2009) and 1988 (2011) on terrorism and the threat to Afghanistan, the Council imposed separate sanctions regimes on Al-Qaeda and the Taliban. 

Resolution 1989 dealt with sanctions relating to Al-Qaeda, while Resolution 1988 (2011) addressed sanctions against the Taliban. Until the passing of both the resolutions, sanctions on the Taliban and Al-Qaeda had been handled by the same committee.

Details
The Security Council reaffirmed that terrorism continued to constitute a "serious" threat to international peace and security. The provisions of the resolution, adopted under Chapter VII of the United Nations Charter, included; 

 Modified the Committee established in Resolution 1267 to include only Al-Qaeda and associates;
 Expanded the mandate of the Ombudsperson created in Resolution 1904 to include the consideration of requests for delisting and the acceptance or rejection of requests;
 Urged states and organisations to provide all necessary information concerning delisting requests for Al-Qaeda or other individuals;
 Ensured that the sanctions were more fairly and transparently applied.

The annex of the resolution provided instructions for the Ombudsperson and Monitoring Committee.

See also
 Al-Qaida and Taliban Sanctions Committee
 List of United Nations Security Council Resolutions 1901 to 2000 (2009 – 2011)
 Terrorism

References

External links
Text of the Resolution at undocs.org
Committee pursuant to resolutions 1267, 1989, and 2253 website (Al-Qaeda Sanctions Committee)

 1989
United Nations Security Council sanctions regimes
Al-Qaeda
Taliban
 1989
June 2011 events